Sie nannten ihn Amigo is an East German film. It was released in 1959.

External links
 

1959 films
East German films
1950s German-language films
Films directed by Heiner Carow
Films set in Berlin
Films about Nazi Germany
German children's films
1950s German films